The Church of St. Casimir the Prince in Kraków, Poland – with the adjacent Franciscan monastery and the catacombs – is located at ul. Reformacka 4 street in the Old Town district (Stare Miasto). Members of the Catholic Order of Franciscans known as "Little Brothers" arrived in Kraków in 1622 and settled at the outskirts of the town in Garbary (1625).

History
The church was completed in 1640 thanks to a donation from Zuzanna Amendówna, bequeathed around 1644 along with the miracle painting of Madonna displayed today at the side altar of the new church. The first church of the Order was destroyed during the Swedish Deluge. In 1658 monks settled at the Reformacka street in a small manor given to them by Stanisław Warszycki, the castellan of Kraków. In 1666 suffragan bishop Mikołaj Oborski laid the foundation stone for the current church. The chief benefactor of the church and the monastery was Franciszek Szembek, a local noble and the castellan of Kamieniec. The newly built Baroque church was consecrated in 1672.

Inside the church there are late Baroque altars originating in 1745–1748. A crucifix stands atop the high altar in accordance with the basic rule of the Order. The Patron of the church, St. Casimir, has his facsimile painted at the side altar (first on the left). This image was most probably painted in 1660-1670 and is assumed to be the work of the Gdańsk painter Daniel Schultz.

The catacombs 

On the outside wall of the Monastery there is an old, historic "bell for the dying" rung only when someone close to the Little Brothers dies. The bell is protected by a small roof. Below the bell is a plaque of black marble, written in reference to its foundation in 1750.

The monastic crypts with mummified bodies are made available for public viewing only once a year on All Souls Day (November 2), the day after All Saints Day. In the past, the mummies attracted crowds of visitors, causing unforeseen climatic challenges.

The catacombs in the crypt under the Church are among some of the most secret places in the city. Unique climatic conditions found in the basement caused the bodies of the dead to undergo a process of natural mummification whereby they remain in an excellent state of preservation. Among them, hidden away since 1667, are the remains of many monks and members of Polish noble families such as Wielopolscy, Szembekowie, and Morsztynowie. Monastic books reveal that in total almost 1,000 bodies were placed in the catacombs over the years, among them around 730 lay people and 250 monks. The remains of the monks – all sitting down – are placed right under the chancel of the church, without coffins, directly on earth and sand. In a glass coffin there is the body of Father Sebastian Wolicki. Among the most notable corpses is the body of Countess Domicella Skalska, who was employed by the Church as a housemaid for 20 years. She revealed her noble origin shortly before her death in 1864.

In the crypt there is also the body of a Napoleonic soldier, formerly dressed in full uniform, with a sabre and rifle.  The monks' oral tradition holds that the soldier was seriously injured and dragged himself to the monastic gates in 1812. He died shortly afterwards, in the infirmary, without regaining consciousness.  During World War II the Germans took away the weapons and set up an air raid shelter in the catacombs.

Notes

References 

 Artur Turyna, Bank fotografii miasta Krakowa:  The church and the mummies: PICTURE GALLERY 
  Zakony Franciszkańskie w Polsce - strona poświęcona gromadzeniu informacji o zakonach franciszkańskich (The history of Franciscan Order in Poland)
  Katalog zabytków sztuki w Polsce, miasto Kraków, Kościoły i klasztory śródmieścia 2 pod redakcją Adama Bochnaka i Jana Samka  wyd. PAN, Warszawa 1978. (Catalogue of art objects; churches and monasteries of the inner city)
  Kościół św. Kazimierza: Ukryte miejsca w Krakowie (The secret places of Krakow)
 Web page about the Kosciol Reformatow with the gallery of photographs

External links
Image gallery

Roman Catholic churches completed in 1672
Casimir
Franciscan churches in Poland
Baroque church buildings in Poland
1672 establishments in the Polish–Lithuanian Commonwealth
17th-century Roman Catholic church buildings in Poland